is a Japanese actress. She has played lead roles in the 2022 live-action television and film adaptations of Welcome to the Occult Forest, and voiced the lead role of Tamaki Tsuru in the 2022 animated film Blue Thermal. Her supporting roles include Ai Hayasaka in the 2019 film Kaguya-sama: Love Is War, and Hina in the 2022 NHK taiga drama The 13 Lords of the Shogun.

Early life 
Hotta was born on April 2, 1998 in Shiga Prefecture. After going to Tokyo to participate in a group audition for the lead role in the drama Solomon's Perjury but failing to win the role, she received additional acting training at the Toei Company Tokyo studio, then in 2014 she participated in another audition event held by the Amuse agency, winning an award from satellite broadcaster Wowow.

Career 
Hotta's first role came in the 2014 Wowow 4-episode drama Themis' Sentence, playing the younger sister of the lead character. After a series of minor appearances in television shows, in 2017 she joined the cast of the NHK asadora Warotenka as Rin Fujioka, the younger sister of the lead character, who was played by Wakana Aoi. Hotta followed these appearances with a series of supporting roles in film adaptations of popular Japanese manga. She played the girlfriend of one of the main characters in the 2018 film adaptation of the manga Rainbow Days, took on the role of Ai Hayasaka in the 2019 film adaptation of Kaguya-sama: Love Is War and its 2021 sequel Kaguya-sama Final: Love Is War, appeared in the 2019 film He Won't Kill, She Won't Die, played Ikumatsu in the 2019 film Rurouni Kenshin: The Beginning, joined the cast of the 2020 film adaptation of Liar × Liar, and played Serina Kanno in the 2021 Shochiku film adaptation of Honey Lemon Soda.

Hotta's first lead role in a film came in the 2019 dramatic film Prison 13, based on the Stanford Prison Experiment, in which she played a guard in a prison-like scenario concocted by an online content creator. The following year she became a regular model for Non-no, appearing in the magazine for the first time in the March 2020 issue and on the cover for the first time in the November 2021 issue. Hotta returned to NHK with her portrayal of Shizu in the 2020 NHK asadora Yell, and appeared as Hina in the 2022 NHK taiga drama The 13 Lords of the Shogun. She again worked with Wowow on the 2022 television drama True Identity, an adaptation of a Tamehito Somei novel. Hotta played the lead role of Miho Ichikawa, an assistant director working on a horror film, in Welcome to the Occult Forest, a 6-episode 2022 Wowow drama that was also edited to film length and released in theaters. She also took on her first voice acting role as the lead character Tamaki Tsuru in the 2022 anime adaptation of Blue Thermal, a story about members of a glider club.

Filmography

Film

Television

References

External links
 

21st-century Japanese actresses
1998 births
Living people
Models from Shiga Prefecture
Voice actresses from Shiga Prefecture